Lindsay Amer is an American LGBTQ+ activist and YouTuber. Amer created and hosts Queer Kid Stuff, a YouTube channel directed at children and focused on LGBT issues. Amer has been recognized by GLAAD, the TED Conference, and the Webby Awards for their work relating to LGBT education and advocacy.

Career

Queer Kid Stuff

Amer is the creator and host of Queer Kid Stuff, a child-directed YouTube channel focused on LGBT issues, as well as CEO of media production company Queer Kid Studios. Amer launched Queer Kid Stuff in April 2016, and states that they created Queer Kid Stuff due to a lack of LGBT education and LGBT representation in the media for the demographic of children ages 3 to 7.

Content 

Queer Kid Stuff is aimed at young children of ages three and up. The show discusses sexuality, gender identity, and other LGBT issues that Amer calls "the ABCs of LGBT", as well as pop-culture topics. The show's presentation is adapted for a child audience; for instance, a video on consent uses the sharing of toys as an example in place of sexual activity.

Queer Kid Stuff is co-hosted by Teddy, a talking teddy bear who, according to Amer, provides the "voice of [a] child" and adds non-binary representation by virtue of it being a "genderless entity". "Relatable" child entertainment and education methods, such as "toys, blocks, and stop-motion animation", are used to explain LGBT concepts. Queer Kid Stuff videos are approximately four minutes long.

Queer Kid Stuff has covered LGBT topics such as homophobia, gay marriage, gender identity, drag, and the history of the Stonewall riots, as well as sexual education issues like consent.

Reception 

Queer Kid Stuff videos have received differing reviews from commentators.

In June 2018, writer Priscilla Blossom, in an article on online magazine Romper, called Queer Kid Stuff "the LGBTQ-positive show we were missing as kids" and evaluated Amer's message of "just [being] happy with the way you are" as one "we can all get behind."

In November 2018, the showing of Queer Kid Stuff videos, among other presentations on transgender issues, at Nederland Elementary School in Boulder County, Colorado caused controversy. One parent wrote to a local news station that the set of presentations went "beyond a simple message of tolerance and acceptance," calling its topic "highly controversial and divisive" and adding that the presentation was "simply not age appropriate."

In an interview in July 2018, Amer responded to a question on the issue of age inappropriateness and indoctrination, stating that "any education for kids this young is technically indoctrination" and that the show's message of "diversity and inclusion" is "a message that every kid needs to see."

Youtube lawsuit 

In August 2019, Amer joined a group of LGBT YouTubers in filing a lawsuit against YouTube and Google, alleging that YouTube and its parent company Google had engaged in unfair demonetization and hiding of videos that was discriminatory toward LGBT content. YouTube representative Alex Joseph responded that "all content" on YouTube was subject to the same content and advertising policies, and that YouTube does not "restrict or demonetize videos based on these factors or the inclusion of terms like 'gay' or 'transgender.'" The group of LGBT YouTubers was represented by the Browne George Ross law firm, which had also filed a lawsuit against YouTube alleging discrimination against conservative YouTubers.

Bluelaces Theatre Company 
Amer is a founder of Bluelaces, a theater company that produces performances and hosts theater workshops and summer camps for people with autism or other developmental disabilities.

Awards and recognitions 

In 2017, Amer was a recipient of the GLAAD Rising Stars Grant, which awards LGBT youth and support initiatives that "champion intersectional LGBTQ issues."

In 2018, Queer Kid Stuff became a Webby Awards honoree in the Public Service & Activism (Channels & Networks) category.

In February 2019, Amer became a TED Resident.

Personal life 

Amer is Jewish and comes from New York City. Amer is non-binary and utilizes they/them pronouns.

Amer received a bachelor's degree in theater and gender studies from Northwestern University and a master's degree in theater and performance studies from Queen Mary University of London.

Harassment 

In 2016, a video by Amer was posted to a Neo-Nazi publication accompanied with a headline that called them a "Sick Dyke" who was trying to "Brainwash Children into the Homosexual Lifestyle". Amer stated that this was followed by a series of anti-Semitic and homophobic remarks being posted in the comments section of their videos and tweeted at both Queer Kid Stuffs and their own Twitter accounts.

References

External links
 Queer Kid Stuff on YouTube

Year of birth missing (living people)
Living people
LGBT YouTubers
American LGBT rights activists
Non-binary activists
Jewish American activists

Jewish American entertainers
Activists from New York City
LGBT people from New York (state)
Northwestern University alumni
Alumni of Queen Mary University of London
YouTubers who make LGBT-related content
Entertainers from New York City
LGBT Jews
21st-century American LGBT people
21st-century American Jews
YouTubers from New York (state)